The 2019 Formula Regional European Championship was a multi-event, Formula 3 open-wheel single seater motor racing championship held across Europe. The championship features a mix of professional and amateur drivers, competing in Formula 3 cars that conform to the FIA Formula 3 regulations for the championship. In the inaugural season of the championship, Frederik Vesti was the drivers' champion.

The season commenced on 14 April at Circuit Paul Ricard and concluded on 20 October at Autodromo Nazionale Monza, after eight meetings.

Teams and drivers
All teams and drivers competed with the Tatuus-Alfa Romeo F.3 T-318.

Race calendar

The provisional calendar was announced on 31 October 2018. The schedule was altered on 9 November 2018 with Hockenheimring replaced by Circuit Paul Ricard, and on 1 December 2018, with the round at Autodromo Enzo e Dino Ferrari moved from its original 9 June date. The last two race weekends of the season at Monza and Mugello were swapped.  The cancelled race from Vallelunga Circuit was rescheduled and run at Autodromo Enzo e Dino Ferrari in Round 5 as a fourth race.

Results

Championship standings

Points are awarded to the top 10 classified finishers in each race. No points are awarded for pole position or fastest lap.

Drivers' standings

Rookies' standings

Teams' standings

Notes

References

External links

Formula Regional European Championship
Formula Regional European Championship seasons
Regional European Championship